Ancylis comptana, the strawberry leaf-roller or Comptan's ancylis moth, is a moth of the family Tortricidae. It is found from the United Kingdom and Scandinavia to northern Spain and Turkey, Asia Minor, Kazakhstan, Uzbekistan, Russia, China, Mongolia, Korea and Japan. In North America, it is represented by ssp. fragariae.

The wingspan is 11–14 mm. Adults are on wing from April to June and from mid-July until September. There are two generations per year in Europe. In the northern United States, moths of the first generation fly from the end of March to April and those of the second in late May and June. Here, a third or sometimes even a fourth generation occurs, flying in August and from September to October.

The larvae feed on Sanguisorba minor, Potentilla, Fragaria, Teucrium, Rosa, Dryas octopetala, Rubus idaeus, Rubus icaesius and Thymus. The larvae damage soft fruits, especially strawberry but also raspberry. The species has become an important pest of strawberries on some locations in the United States.

Subspecies 
 Ancylis comptana comptana (Eurasia)
 Ancylis comptana fragariae (North America)

References

External links 
 Eurasian Tortricidae
 Bug Guide

Enarmoniini
Moths of Asia
Moths of North America
Tortricidae of Europe
Moths described in 1828